The Seleucid king Seleucus V Philometor (Greek: Σέλευκος Ε΄ ὁ Φιλομήτωρ; 126/125 BC), ruler of the Hellenistic Seleucid kingdom, was the eldest son of Demetrius II Nicator and Cleopatra Thea. The epithet Philometor means "mother-loving" and in the Hellenistic world usually indicated that the mother acted as co-regent for the prince.

Biography
Just before Antiochus VII Sidetes died fighting the Parthians in late 129, the Parthian king Phraates II had released Demetrius II, who entered Syria in ca. September 129. This forced Seleucus V's half-brother Antiochus IX to flee to Cyzicus. Cleopatra Thea remarried Demetrius and reunited him with his two sons, Seleucus V and Antiochus VIII.

Antiochus VII had taken a son, also named Seleucus, and Seleucus V's sister, Laodice, on his campaign against Parthia, and when Antiochus was killed, this Seleucus and Laodice were captured. Phraates married Laodice and showed this Seleucus (not to be confused with Seleucus V) great favor. As Demetrius II fought a civil war against the usurper, Alexander II Zabinas, Phraates sent this Seleucus back to Syria with the body of his father, Antiochus VII, to claim the Seleucid throne as puppet king of the Parthians. Yet this Seleucus failed and returned to Parthia, where he later died.

Instead, after his father was murdered outside of Tyre in 125, Seleucus V claimed the throne as the eldest son of Demetrius II; however, he was soon killed by his own mother. According to Appian, Cleopatra Thea had aided in the death of Demetrius, and therefore, she was afraid that Seleucus V might avenge the assassination of his father. This encouraged Cleopatra Thea to remove Seleucus in favor of his younger brother, Antiochus VIII.

See also

 List of Syrian monarchs
 Timeline of Syrian history

References 

 

2nd-century BC Seleucid rulers
Seleucid rulers
125 BC deaths
2nd-century BC rulers in Asia
Year of birth unknown
Seleucus 05